Tsetzi Lake (Pan Phillips) Airport  is located adjacent to Tsetzi Lake, British Columbia, Canada. The lake is pronounced "Tezy".

References

Registered aerodromes in British Columbia
Cariboo Regional District